Hambley is a surname. Notable people with the surname include:

John Hambley (martyr) (died 1587), English Catholic and martyr
John Hambley (producer), British television and film producer
Mark Gregory Hambley (born 1948), veteran of more than 30 years in the U.S. diplomatic service